Ergün Zorlu is a Turkish tennis player. He reached the final of the 2009 ITF Men's Turkey F7 Future Cup, losing to Marco Simoni 6-4, 6-2. Later, he joined in the Turkey F8 Futures, losing 1-2 in the first round to Timo Nieminen.

Singles Finals

References

 ATP World Tour

External links
 Türk raket Zorlu finalde Hürriyet, (in Turkish) 21 March 2017. Retrieved 20 November 2022.
 

1985 births
Living people
Turkish male tennis players
Sportspeople from Istanbul